Howel is an unincorporated community in Christian County, Kentucky, United States.

History
Howel had its start when the railroad was extended to that point. A post office was established at Howel in 1886, and remained in operation until 1957.

References

Unincorporated communities in Christian County, Kentucky
Unincorporated communities in Kentucky